Niagara County is in the U.S. state of New York. As of the 2020 census, the population was 212,666.  The county seat is Lockport. The county name is from the Iroquois word Onguiaahra; meaning the strait or thunder of waters.

Niagara County is part of the Buffalo–Niagara Falls metropolitan area, and across the Canada–US border is the province of Ontario.

It is the location of Niagara Falls and Fort Niagara, and has many parks and lake shore recreation communities. In the summer of 2008, Niagara County celebrated its 200th birthday with the first settlement of the county,  of Niagara Falls.

History
When counties were established in the New York colony in 1683, the present Niagara County was part of Albany County. Prior to the British, the area was part of New Netherland.

Albany was an enormous county, including the northern part of New York State as well as all of the present State of Vermont and, in theory, extending westward to the Pacific Ocean. This county was reduced in size on July 3, 1766, by the creation of Cumberland County, and further on March 16, 1770, by the creation of Gloucester County, both containing territory now in Vermont.

On March 12, 1772, what was left of Albany County was split into three parts, one remaining under the name Albany County. One of the other pieces, Tryon County, contained the western portion (and thus, since no western boundary was specified, theoretically still extended west to the Pacific). The eastern boundary of Tryon County was approximately five miles west of the present city of Schenectady, and the county included the western part of the Adirondack Mountains and the area west of the West Branch of the Delaware River. The area then designated as Tryon County now includes 37 counties of New York State. The county was named for William Tryon, colonial governor of New York.

In the years prior to 1776, most of the Loyalists in Tryon County fled to Canada including the likes of local judge John Butler and militia commander Sir John Johnson. In 1784, following the peace treaty that ended the American Revolutionary War, the name of Tryon County was changed to honor the general, Richard Montgomery, who had captured several places in Canada and died attempting to capture the city of Quebec, replacing the name of the hated British governor.

In 1789, Ontario County was split off from Montgomery. In turn, Genesee County was created from Ontario County in 1802.

Niagara County was created from Genesee County in 1808. It was, however, larger than the present Niagara County even though it consisted of only the Town of Cambria.

From 1814 to 1817, records of Cattaraugus County were divided between Belmont (the seat of Allegany County) and Buffalo (then in Niagara County). Niagara County governed the western portion of Cattaraugus County, then known as the town of Perry.

In 1821, Erie County was created from Niagara County.

The county has a number of properties on the National Register of Historic Places.

Geography

Niagara County is in the most western part of New York State, just north of the city Buffalo and bordering Lake Ontario on its northern border, and the Niagara River Canada on its western border.

The county's primary geographic feature is Niagara Falls, the riverbed of which has eroded seven miles south over the past 12,000 years since the last ice age. The Niagara River and Niagara Falls, are in effect, the drainage ditch for four of the Great Lakes which constitute the world's largest supply of fresh water. The water flows north from Lake Erie, then through the Niagara River, goes over Niagara Falls, and then on to Lake Ontario and the St. Lawrence River, eventually emptying into the North Atlantic Ocean. Today, tourists and visitors to the Falls see a diminished flow of water over the Falls, since a portion of the flow has been diverted for hydroelectric power purposes. Both the American and Canadian side of the Niagara River have massive electrical power plants.

The Niagara Gorge is the path Niagara Falls has taken over thousands of years as it continues to erode. Niagara Falls started at the Niagara Escarpment which cuts Niagara County in half in an east–west direction. North of the Escarpment lies the Lake Ontario plain, which is a fertile flatland used to grow grapes, apples, peaches and other fruits and vegetables. The grape variety Niagara, source of most American white grape juice but not esteemed for wine, was first grown in the county, in 1868. Viticulture, or wine culture has begun to take place, with several wineries below the escarpment. This has helped to improve the depressed economy of the region.

Adjacent counties and areas
 Orleans County - east
 Genesee County - southeast
 Erie County - south
 Regional Municipality of Niagara, Ontario, Canada - west

Major highways

  Interstate 190 (Niagara Thruway)
  U.S. Route 62
  US 62 Business
  New York State Route 18
  New York State Route 31
  New York State Route 78
  New York State Route 93
  New York State Route 104
  New York State Route 265
  New York State Route 384
  New York State Route 425
  Niagara Scenic Parkway
  LaSalle Expressway

State protected areas
 De Veaux Woods State Park, north of the City of Niagara Falls.
 Devil's Hole State Park, immediately north of the City of Niagara Falls.
 Fort Niagara State Park, located at the mouth of the Niagara River.
 Earl W. Brydges Artpark State Park, in the Town of Lewiston.
 Four Mile Creek State Park, on the shore of Lake Ontario.
 Golden Hill State Park, on the shore of Lake Ontario.
 Hartland Swamp Wildlife Management Area—a conservation area in the Town of Hartland.
 Joseph Davis State Park, along the Niagara River.
 Niagara Reservation State Park, in the City of Niagara Falls.
 Reservoir State Park, south of the power reservoir.
 Tonawanda Wildlife Management Area, partly in the Town of Royalton.
 Wilson-Tuscarora State Park, on the shore of Lake Ontario.

Government and politics

Structure
Niagara County is governed by a 15-member Legislature, with the Chairman of the Legislature as the de facto head of county government. Currently, there are 11 members of the Republican-led Majority Caucus and four members of the Democrat-led Minority Caucus. The Legislature formerly consisted of 19 members, but was downsized to 15 seats effective January 1, 2012 based on the results of a public referendum.

A subordinate county manager reports to the County Legislature. Governing functions of the Legislature rely on a committee system. There are five standing committees and one long-term ad hoc committee: Administration; Community Services; Community Safety and Security; Economic Development; Public Works; and the ad hoc Refuse Disposal District Committee .

The dominant political party in the Niagara County Legislature is currently the Republican Party, which is ancestrally the dominant party in Niagara County.

Other entities
In addition to the areas mentioned above, much of Niagara County is serviced by a Water District and a Sewer District. Both bodies are subordinate to the County Legislature; the former has a direct relationship, while the latter is currently under limited oversight of the town supervisors within the district.

State and federal government

|}

Niagara County is part of:
 The 8th Judicial District of the New York Supreme Court
 The 4th Division of the New York Supreme Court, Appellate Division

Demographics

As of the census of 2010, there were 216,469 people, 87,846 households, and 58,593 families residing in the county. The population density was 420 people per square mile (162/km2). There were 95,715 housing units at an average density of 183 per square mile (71/km2). The racial makeup of the county was 90.70% White, 6.15% Black or African American, 0.94% Native American, 0.58% Asian, 0.02% Pacific Islander, 0.40% from other races, and 1.21% from two or more races. 1.33% of the population were Hispanic or Latino of any race. 23.6% were of German, 18.1% Italian, 11.3% Irish, 11.2% Polish and 8.3% English ancestry. 94.5% spoke English, 1.6% Spanish and 1.0% Italian as their first language.

There were 87,846 households, out of which 30.90% had children under the age of 18 living with them, 50.30% were married couples living together, 12.30% had a female householder with no husband present, and 33.30% were non-families. 28.60% of all households were made up of individuals, and 12.00% had someone living alone who was 65 years of age or older. The average household size was 2.45 and the average family size was 3.03.

In the county, the population was spread out, with 24.70% under the age of 18, 8.50% from 18 to 24, 28.40% from 25 to 44, 23.10% from 45 to 64, and 15.40% who were 65 years of age or older. The median age was 38 years. For every 100 females there were 93.30 males. For every 100 females age 18 and over, there were 89.50 males.

The median income for a household in the county was $38,136, and the median income for a family was $47,817. Males had a median income of $37,468 versus $24,668 for females. The per capita income for the county was $19,219. About 8.20% of families and 10.60% of the population were below the poverty line, including 15.00% of those under age 18 and 7.30% of those age 65 or over.

2020 Census

Education
Niagara University is located in Lewiston, New York. Niagara County Community College is located in Sanborn, New York. Many Niagara County residents also attend Erie and other Western New York County Schools.
In the Buffalo Metro area there are more than 20 public and private colleges and universities offering programs in technical and vocational training, graduate, and professional studies.

K-12 school districts
School districts include:

 Barker Central School District
 Lewiston-Porter Central School District
 Lockport City School District

 Newfane Central School District
 Niagara Falls City School District
 Niagara-Wheatfield Central School District
 North Tonawanda City School District
 Royalton-Hartland Central School District
 Starpoint Central School District
 Wilson Central School District

Communities

Larger settlements

Towns

 Cambria
 Hartland
 Lewiston
 Lockport
 Newfane
 Niagara
 Pendleton
 Porter
 Royalton
 Somerset
 Wheatfield
 Wilson

Hamlets

 Nashville
 Orangeport
 Pekin

CDPs

 Newfane
 Niagara University
 Olcott
 Ransomville
 Rapids
 Sanborn
 South Lockport

Indian reservations
 Tuscarora Reservation
 Tonawanda Reservation

See also

 List of counties in New York
 National Register of Historic Places listings in Niagara County, New York
 Niagara (electoral district)

Footnotes

Further reading
 History of Niagara County, New York: With Illustrations Descriptive of Its Scenery, Private Residences, Public Buildings, Fine Blocks, Public Manufactures, and Portraits of Old Pioneers and Prominent Residents. New York: Sanford & Co., 1878.
 John Theodore Horton, Edward Theodore Williams, and Harry Stevens Douglass, History of Northwestern New York: Erie, Niagara, Wyoming, Genesee and Orleans Counties. Lewis Publishing Co., 1947.
 Robert D. Kostoff, A History of Niagara County, New York. Lewiston, NY: Edwin Mellen Press, 2001.
 Niagara County Pioneer Association, Souvenir History of Niagara County, New York: Commemorative of the 25th Anniversary of the Pioneer Association of Niagara County. Lockport, NY: The Lockport Journal, 1902.
 William Pool, Landmarks of Niagara County, New York. Syracuse, NY: D. Mason & Co., 1897.
 
 Samuel T. Wiley and Winfield Scott Garner, Biographical and Portrait Cyclopedia of Niagara County, New York. Philadelphia: Gresham Publishing Co., 1892.
 Edward T. Williams, Niagara County, New York: A Concise Record of Her Progress and People, 1821-1921, Published during Its Centennial Year. In Two Volumes. Chicago: J.H. Beers & Co., 1921.

External links
 Niagara County webpage
 

 
1808 establishments in New York (state)
Populated places established in 1808
Buffalo–Niagara Falls metropolitan area
New York placenames of Native American origin